John Balbach (February 13, 1820 - August 4, 1896) was a pioneering settler and prominent citizen of San Jose, California. As a blacksmith, he made the first commercially available metal plow on the west coast, in 1852. He was a founder of the San Jose Volunteer Fire Department. The Downtown "Balbach Street", that adjuncts Woz Way named for Apple co-founder Steve Wozniak, is named in his honor. Balbach has two commemorative plaques in the city, one installed by the Germania Verein (Club) on its 150th anniversary in 2006; and one by the larger German-American community, on Market South Street where his blacksmith shop was once located.

Biography
Balbach was born in Mergentheim, Germany, on February 13, 1820. He arrived in New York in 1848. Shortly afterward he went to Harrisburg, Owen County, Kentucky, where he obtained employment in a carriage factory. On March 28, 1849, he and nine others started from Kentucky across the plains to California, with the expectation of making their fortunes at mining. They encountered many hardships on the trail and finally reached Los Angeles August 10, 1849. After a stay of several months in Los Angeles, Balbach and two companions started northward, along the coast for the gold mines. They reached San Jose in the early part of December and went into camp for a few days. During the first night of their stay Balbach's horse was stolen and he was compelled to abandon his trip and stay here and seek employment. After working a short time he opened a blacksmith shop. In the spring of 1852 Balbach manufactured the first plow made on the Pacific Coast, and the following year he made over fifty plows.  He established the Pioneer Carriage Manufactory, the first shop in San Jose where a carriage could be repaired or a new one built. It was on the corner of Second and Fountain Streets, and managed in part by three of his sons.

Mr. Balbach, on November 15, 1854, married Wenna Benner (1826-1905), a native of Germany, with whom he had six sons and three daughters. His children included John Theodore Balbach (1860-1899), George L Balbach (1865-1929) and Louis Augusta Balbach (1868-1908). His grandson Louis James Balbach (1896-1943) was an American diver who competed in the 1920 Summer Olympics.

Balbach served two years on the San Jose City Council and five years as a member of the Board of School Trustees.

He died on August 4, 1896 at home at 523 South Market street at 6 o'clock in the morning. He had been ill for several months with heart affection and asthma.

References

1820 births
1896 deaths
People from San Jose, California